Stevnemøte med glemte år (Rendezvous with Forgotten Years) is a 1957 Norwegian drama film directed by Jon Lennart Mjøen. It was entered into the 7th Berlin International Film Festival.

Cast
 Mona Hofland
 Espen Skjønberg
 Henki Kolstad
 Inger Marie Andersen
 Jon Lennart Mjøen
 Rolf Christensen
 Pål Skjønberg
 Bab Christensen
 Eva Steen

References

External links

1957 films
1950s Norwegian-language films
1957 drama films
Norwegian black-and-white films
Films directed by Jon Lennart Mjøen
Norwegian drama films